Presidential elections were held in the United States of Colombia in 1870. The result was a victory for Eustorgio Salgar of the Liberal Party.

Electoral system
The 1863 constitution changed the electoral system from a direct vote to an indirect vote. The President was now elected on the basis of which candidate received the most votes in each state, with a candidate required to win in at least five of the nine states to be elected. If no candidate received a majority, Congress would elect the President from the main contenders.

Results
The electors were elected in 1869.

References

Colombia
Presidential elections in Colombia
1870 in Colombia